Paul H. Cress (1939–2004) was a Canadian computer scientist.

He was a young lecturer in computer science at the University of Waterloo (Waterloo, Ontario, Canada) when, starting in 1966, he and his colleague Paul Dirksen led a team of programmers developing a fast Fortran programming language compiler called WATFOR (WATerloo FORtran), for the IBM System/360 family of computers.  The /360 WATFOR project was initiated by Professor J. Wesley Graham, following the successful implementation in 1965 of a WATFOR compiler for the IBM 7040 computer.  An enhanced version of the /360 WATFOR compiler was called WATFIV, variously interpreted to mean "WATerloo Fortran IV" or "WATFOR-plus-one".

In 1972, Cress and Dirksen were joint winners of the Grace Murray Hopper Award from the Association for Computing Machinery, "For the creation of the WATFOR Compiler, the first member of a powerful new family of diagnostic and educational programming tools."   
Cress died August 20, 2004, aged 65.

Publications

See also
 List of University of Waterloo people

References

1939 births
2004 deaths
Fortran
Grace Murray Hopper Award laureates
Academic staff of the University of Waterloo
Canadian computer scientists